Nepotianus may refer to:
 Nepotianus, Roman usurper of the 4th century;
 Nepotianus (magister militiae), Roman general of the 5th century;
 Nepotian of Asturias, Asturian king of the 9th century